Arthur McCabe (1871 – after 1896) was an English footballer who played as an outside left. Born in Sheffield, McCabe started his career with local side Heeley before spending time with Rotherham Town.

It was from Rotherham that his home town club Sheffield United signed him in July 1892.  United were now a Football League side and McCabe was unable to break into the first team, spending the majority of his time at Bramall Lane playing in the reserves.  His only competitive start for the Blades came in a Northern League fixture in January 1893, but despite this he remained with the club until July 1895.

United allowed McCabe to return to Rotherham Town, for whom he made 18 league appearances before joining Manchester City in January 1896.  His time with Manchester City was unsuccessful and he made only one further league appearance for the Lancashire club before joining Ilkeston Town the following summer.

References

English footballers
Association football forwards
English Football League players
Rotherham Town F.C. (1878) players
Sheffield United F.C. players
Manchester City F.C. players
Ilkeston Town F.C. (1880s) players
Footballers from Sheffield
1871 births
Date of death unknown
Northern Football League players